The 1997 SAGA World World Indoor Bowls Championship  was held at Preston Guild Hall, Preston, England, from 23 January – 2 February 1997. In the singles Hugh Duff won his second title beating Andy Thomson in the final. In the pairs Tony Allcock won his seventh title in his first partnering with Mervyn King.

The Women's World Championship sponsored by British Steel took place in Llanelli from April 19–20. The event was won by Norma Shaw.

Winners

Draw and results

Men's singles

Men's Pairs

Women's singles

Group stages

Knockout

References

External links 
Official website

World Indoor Bowls Championship